Amo Creek is a stream in North Slope Borough, Alaska, in the United States. It is a tributary of the Colville River

The name Amo is derived from the Eskimo word meaning "wolf".

See also
 List of rivers of Alaska

References

Rivers of North Slope Borough, Alaska
Rivers of Alaska